The Power Macintosh 7500 is a personal computer designed, manufactured and sold by Apple Computer from August 1995 to May 1996. 
The 7500 was introduced alongside the Power Macintosh 7200 and 8500 at the 1995 MacWorld Expo in Boston.  Apple referred to these machines collectively as the "Power Surge" line, communicating that these machines offered a significant speed improvement over its predecessors.  The 7500 introduced a new case design, later dubbed "Outrigger" by Mac enthusiasts.
There were two derivative models: the Power Macintosh 7600, identical to the 7500 except for the CPU which was a PowerPC 604 or 604e processor instead of the 7500's 601; and the Power Macintosh 7300, identical to the 7600 but without the video inputs found in both the 7500 and 7600.

Hardware 
The 7500 is one of the first PCI-capable Macs manufactured by Apple; NuBus expansion cards are not supported. It has a PowerPC 601 processor rated at 100 MHz that is replaceable via a daughtercard. It also includes full composite video and s-video input capability, but no output, as the 7500 was designed to be a video conferencing system, not a multimedia editing machine—this was the 8500's task. 

The main bus runs at 45 MHz or 50 MHz (set by the CPU daughtercard), and the CPU at integer or half-integer multiples of this speed. The bus can be temperamental with sensitivity to different kinds of RAM or of L2 cache, which could cause problems with aftermarket CPU cards trying to increase the clock speed.

Models 
In addition to the standard matrix of configurations available from Apple, various third-party resellers offered a wide variety of configurations.
 Power Macintosh 7500/100: 8 or 16 MB RAM, 512 MB or 1 GB HDD, AppleCD 600i 4x CD-ROM drive.

Timeline

References 

7500
7500
Macintosh desktops
Computer-related introductions in 1995

it:Power Macintosh 7500